Pacific Blue is an American crime drama series about a team of police officers with the Santa Monica Police Department who patrolled its beaches on bicycles. The show ran for five seasons on the USA Network, from March 2, 1996, to April 9, 2000, with a total of 101 episodes.

Series overview

Episodes

Season 1 (1996)

Season 2 (1996–97)

Season 3 (1997–98)

Season 4 (1998–99)

Season 5 (1999–2000)

External links
 
 

Lists of American crime drama television series episodes